"Cochranella" geijskesi, also known as the Wilhelmina Cochran frog, is a species of frog in the family Centrolenidae. It is endemic to Suriname. Its natural habitats are subtropical or tropical moist lowland forests and rivers.

Sources

Cochranella
Endemic fauna of Suriname
Taxonomy articles created by Polbot